The County of Bowen is a county (a cadastral division) in Queensland, Australia, located in the Wide Bay–Burnett region to the west of Bundaberg. It was named in honour of Sir George Ferguson Bowen, the first Governor of Queensland. On 7 March 1901, the Governor issued a proclamation legally dividing Queensland into counties under the Land Act 1897. Its schedule described Bowen thus:

Parishes 
Bowen is divided into parishes, as listed below:

References

Bowen

External links